Ahmad Said (born 15 February 1957) is a Malaysian politician who served as the 13th Menteri Besar of Terengganu from March 2008 to May 2013 and Member of the Terengganu State Executive Council (EXCO) from 1995 to his promotion to the Menteri Besarship in March 2008. He has served as State Leader of the Opposition of Terengganu since March 2019 and Member of the Terengganu State Legislative Assembly (MLA) for Kijal from October 1990 to November 1999 and again since March 2004. He is a member of the United Malays National Organisation (UMNO), a component party of the ruling Barisan Nasional (BN) coalition. He is also the State Chairman of BN and UMNO of Terengganu and Division Chief of UMNO of Kemaman.

Profile
Ahmad Said is a political science graduate from Universiti Sains Malaysia and was firstly elected as an assemblyman in 1990, at the young age of only 33 years old. He has eight children as a result of his polygamous marriage with two women and each of his two wives live one kilometer apart from his own residence.

Menteri Besar of Terengganu
Following the 2008 Malaysian general election, Barisan Nasional won a majority in the Terengganu state election with 24 out of 32 state seats, with the Malaysian Islamic Party (PAS) winning the remaining eight seats.

In the formation of the new Terengganu state government, the federal government under the then prime minister Abdullah Ahmad Badawi put forth the reappointment of Datuk Seri Idris Jusoh to a second term as Menteri Besar. Abdullah claimed Idris received full support of 23 of the 24 Barisan Nasional state assemblymen elected.

In what political analysts described as a possible constitutional crisis, trouble began to precipitate after the Sultan of Terengganu, Tuanku Mizan Zainal Abidin, who was also then Yang di-Pertuan Agong (King) of Malaysia, refused to re-appoint and swear in Idris as Menteri Besar. Similar problems occurred in the state of Perlis where the PM's choice was also rejected and eventually the PM had to give in to the Raja of Perlis.

On 22 March 2008, the office of the Sultan of Terengganu announced the appointment of the Kijal assemblyman Ahmad Said instead of Idris Jusoh.

The prime minister responded by saying that the appointment of Ahmad Said was "unconstitutional" as it went against the wishes of the assemblymen and the prime Minister's office who have supported Idris Jusoh's candidacy for Menteri Besar. The 22 other assemblymen had also pledged their support toward the appointment of Idris Jusoh according to the then deputy prime minister Najib Tun Razak.

In spite of threats to strip Ahmad Said of his UMNO membership "for disobeying the leadership", he went to the office in Wisma Darul Iman to begin the first day of his new appointment on 25 March 2008. Ahmad Said was subsequently stripped of his UMNO membership. This technically disqualified him from representing the state UMNO and therefore commanding the majority in the legislative assembly to be appointed as Menteri Besar in the first place.

The ruling party also planned to vote down the Sultan's choice through a motion of no-confidence by 22 UMNO state assemblymen. The opposition party Parti Islam SeMalaysia in the meantime promised that its assemblymen would support Ahmad Said as Menteri Besar.

On 26 March 2008, Prime Minister Abdullah Ahmad Badawi and Sultan Mizan Zainal Abidin met at Istana Negara to resolve the impasse. The prime minister reversed his stance and decided to accept the king's appointment of Ahmad Said as Menteri Besar of Terengganu. He also apologised to the king for the public spat over the appointment of the Menteri Besar, explaining that there was no intention to disparage or humiliate the royal household. The apparent backdown was due to a threat that the royal household would be prepared to dissolve the state assembly if the motion of no-confidence was initiated against Ahmad Said, which would trigger another election in what iwas already a climate of discontent towards the ruling party and the possibility of dissenting assemblymen defecting to the opposition.

The UMNO Supreme Council proceeded to endorse Ahmad Said as the new Menteri Besar of Terengganu. With the resolution of the impasse, Ahmad Said expressed his gratitude over his appointment and paid tribute to Idris an old friend he has known since their university days, for the contributions that he has done for the Terengganu people so far and to seek his advice. After the swearing-in ceremony, he also expressed hope in moving on to discharge his responsibility to the people and eradicate poverty within the state.

He resigned as Menteri Besar on 12 May 2014, making way for Ahmad Razif Abdul Rahman, an assemblyman from Seberang Takir to take over his position. This was made as an agreement with the prime minister, Najib Razak that he would step down during second term in order to give way to a younger politician or a capable leader. He, however, did not step down without another controversy (or crisis during his appointment). He and Ajil assemblyman, Ghazali Taib followed by Bukit Besi assemblyman, Roslee Daud, left UMNO, the ruling party in Terengganu and caused the state to have a minority ruling government Barisan Nasional (14 state assemblymen) and a majority opposition Pakatan Rakyat (15 state assemblymen) with three independent assemblymen for the first time in Malaysia's history. This is because he felt slighted when Najib Razak rejected his proposal to resign after his daughter's wedding reception. However, all three then revoked their decision and returned to UMNO. He later pledged to give his full support to the new MB. He then too attempted a no-confidence motion against his successor during a 2015 Terengganu state assembly meeting but failed.

Post-GE 14
He remained in the Kijal state seat at the 14th general election and won against PAS and PH candidates with a majority of 1265 votes. He won the Kemaman UMNO division chief in the 2018 party elections but lost in his UMNO vice-presidency. He was re-appointed Terengganu UMNO liaison chairman to replace Datuk Seri Mahdzir Khalid on 11 January 2019.

Election results

Honours
  :
  Knight Commander of the Order of the Crown of Terengganu (DPMT) - Dato' (2004)
  Knight Grand Companion of the Order of Sultan Mizan Zainal Abidin of Terengganu (SSMZ) - Dato' Seri (2009)

References

1957 births
Living people
Malaysian people of Malay descent
Malaysian Muslims
Chief Ministers of Terengganu
Terengganu state executive councillors
People from Terengganu
United Malays National Organisation politicians
Members of the Terengganu State Legislative Assembly
Universiti Sains Malaysia alumni
Knights Commander of the Order of the Crown of Terengganu